Thepytus thyrea  is a Neotropical butterfly in the family Lycaenidae. It is found in French Guiana, Panama and Brazil (Amazonas).

References

Theclinae
Butterflies described in 1867